This is a list of college swimming and diving teams that compete in the NCAA or NAIA Men's and/or Women's Swimming and Diving Championships.

NCAA Division I

Schools Transitioning to Division I

Schools Addings Division I Swimming & Diving Programs

Notes

NCAA Division II

Schools Transitioning to Division II

Schools Adding Division II Swimming & Diving Programs

Notes

NCAA Division III

Notes

NAIA

Notes

NJCAA

See also
 NCAA Division I
 List of NCAA Division I Institutions
 NCAA Division I Men's Swimming and Diving Championships
 NCAA Division I Women's Swimming and Diving Championships
 NCAA Division II
 List of NCAA Division II Institutions
 NCAA Division III
 List of NCAA Division III Institutions
 List of NCAA conferences
 National Association of Intercollegiate Athletics
 NAIA Men's Swimming and Diving Championships
 NAIA Women's Swimming and Diving Championships

References

 
College swimming